Spata-Artemida is a municipality in the East Attica regional unit, Attica, Greece. The seat of the municipality is the town Spata. The municipality has an area of 73.695 km2.

Municipality
The municipality Spata–Artemida was formed at the 2011 local government reform by the merger of the following 2 former municipalities, that became municipal units:
Artemida
Spata-Loutsa

Economy
Olympic Air has its headquarters at Athens International Airport in Spata. Goody's S.A., a Greek fast food company, is also headquartered at the airport.

Government and infrastructure
The Air Accident Investigation and Aviation Safety Board has an office at the airport.

References

 
Municipalities of Attica
Populated places in East Attica